Meatu District is one of the five districts of the Simiyu Region of Tanzania.  It is bordered to the north by the Itilima District, to the west by the Maswa District and Shinyanga Region to the east by the Arusha Region, to the southeast by the Manyara Region and to the south by the Singida Region. Its district capital is the town of Mwanhuzi.

According to the 2002 Tanzania National Census, the population of Meatu District was 248,949.

According to the 2012 Tanzania National Census, the population of Meatu District was 299,619.
Meatu District CouncilWilaya Ya MeatuHalmashauri ya Wilaya Meatu

Transport
Unpaved Trunk road T37 from Shinyanga to Singida Region passes through the district.

Administrative subdivisions
As of 2012, Meatu District was administratively divided into 25 wards.

Wards

 Bukundi
 Imalaseko
 Itinje
 Kimali
 Kisesa
 Lingeka
 Lubiga
 Mwabuma
 Mwabusalu
 Mwabuzo
 Mwakisandu
 Mwamalole
 Mwamanimba
 Mwamanongu
 Mwamishali
 Mwandoya
 Mwangundo
 Mwanhuzi
 Mwanjolo
 Mwanyahina
 Mwasengela
 Nghoboko
 Nkoma
 Sakasaka
 Tindabuligi

Sources
 Meatu District Homepage for the 2002 Tanzania National Census

References

Districts of Simiyu Region